Fuerte Tiuna or Fort Tiuna (more formally the Military Complex of Fort Tiuna) is the name given to one of the most recognized military installations in the city of Caracas and the South American and Caribbean country of Venezuela.

There are important institutions of various types, such as the headquarters of the Ministry of Popular Power for Defense, EFOFAC, The General Command of the Army, El Libertador Shooting Range, the Army Food Center, the Caracas Military Circle, Paseo Los Próceres, the Bolívar Battalion, La Viñeta Residence (Official Residence of the Vice President) and some units of the Venezuelan Military Academy.

It is located between Coche and El Valle parishes, both south of the Libertador Municipality and southwest of the Caracas Metropolitan District, to the north center of Venezuela.

It houses not only military structures but also sports, urban, cultural, financial spaces etc, highlights the Tiuna City Complex a complex of thousands of homes built under the auspices of the Ministry of Habitat and Housing and Residences Carlos Raúl Villanueva assigned to military personnel.

It is bordered largely by the Regional Highway of the Center and the Valle Coche Highway.

Gallery

See also 

 History of Venezuela
 National Bolivarian Armed Forces of Venezuela
 National Experimental University of the Armed Forces

References 

Buildings and structures in Caracas
Tiuna
Military installations of Venezuela
Forts